Janomot is a British Bengali-language weekly newspaper.

Content
Janomot was founded in London and established on 21 February 1969. It is the first Bengali weekly newspaper, the first ethnic minority newspaper in Britain and the first Bengali newsweekly published outside Bangladesh.

The newspaper's regular features include home and international news and politics. It has subscribers in Germany, France, Spain, Austria, Australia, U.S, Canada, Africa, the Middle East and Bangladesh.

See also
 British Bangladeshi
 List of newspapers in London

References

External links
 
 English version website

Publications established in 1969
1969 establishments in England
Newspapers published in London
Bengali-language newspapers
Weekly newspapers published in the United Kingdom
National newspapers published in the United Kingdom
British Bangladeshi mass media